{{Automatic taxobox
| fossil_range = Ypresian, 
| image = Propalaeotherium hassiacum.jpg
| image_caption = Restored P. hassiacum skeleton
| taxon = Propalaeotherium
| authority = Gervais, 1849
| type_species = †Propalaeotherium isselanum
| type_species_authority = Cuvier, 1824
| subdivision_ranks = Species
| subdivision =
 †P. argentonicum
 †P. hassiacum
 †P. helveticum
 †P. isselanum
 †P. sudrei
 †P. voigti
}}Propalaeotherium was an early genus of perissodactyl endemic to Europe and Asia during the early Eocene. There are currently six recognised species within the genus, with P. isselanum as the type species (named by Georges Cuvier in 1824).

Taxonomy
 Propalaeotherium was named by Paul Gervais; its name means "before Palaeotherium". It was considered a member of Palaeotheriidae by Hooker (1986). A 2004 study found it to be an equid instead. A 2016 study lumped the genus back within the Palaeotheriidae.

The species P. parvulum and P. messelensis have been alternately assigned to the equid genus Eurohippus.

Description
 Propalaeotherium'' was a small animal, ranging from 30–60 cm at the shoulder (2.9 to 5.9 hands), and weighing just . It looked similar to small tapirs. It had no hooves, but instead several small nail-like hooflets. The well-preserved Messel fossils showed their herbivory, specifically their preference to eat berries and leaf matter picked up from the forest floor.

See also

Evolution of the horse
List of prehistoric mammals

References

External links
 BBC Online Science and Nature
 Horse Evolution

Eocene horses
Eocene genus extinctions
Eocene mammals of Europe
Prehistoric placental genera
Eocene mammals of Asia
Fossil taxa described in 1849